The Minister Head of the Civil House of the Presidency of the Republic is the chief of staff of the Presidency of the Federative Republic of Brazil, and a member of the President's cabinet. The post was established on 1 December 1938.

In Brazil, the Chief of Staff is a member of the president's cabinet, with the rank of Minister. As of 2009, the office of the Chief of Staff had an annual budget of US$3.1 billion.

The Chief of Staff is responsible for assisting the President and overseeing all cabinet requests and bureaucratic procedures involving the Presidency. Other responsibilities include negotiations with Congress and state governors. For that reason, the presidential Chief of Staff is generally regarded as the "second most powerful person in Brazil".

List of chiefs of staff of the presidency

References

External links 
 Office of the Chief of Staff

Chiefs of staff
Executive branch of Brazil